The 1920 Fordham Maroon football team was an American football team that represented Fordham University as an independent during the 1920 college football season. In its first season under coaches Charles Brickley and Joseph DuMoe, Fordham compiled a 4–3 record. Fordham's media guide claims three additional victories, two over Fort H. G. Wright and a second victory over Villanova.

Schedule

References

Fordham
Fordham Rams football seasons
Fordham Maroon football